Madeline in London is a children's picture book by Ludwig Bemelmans. It features popular children's character Madeline. It was published in the August 1961 issue of Holiday Magazine, complete with Bemelmans's drawings. It was first published in book form by Viking Press in 1961.

Plot
Madeline and her class, accompanied by Miss Clavel, journey to London to visit their friend Pepito, the son of the Spanish Ambassador. Pepito used to be the neighbor of Madeline and the other students but had to move to London and is sad. The visit by his friends is a special surprise.

Ludwig Bemelmans, 
Publisher: Viking Juvenile
   Edition: Hardcover; 1961-10-06

References
 https://web.archive.org/web/20110604122600/http://isbndb.com/d/book/madeline_in_london_a02.html

Notes

1961 children's books
American picture books
Children's fiction books
London in fiction